Fatehabad Chandrawatiganj Junction (station code: FTD) is a railway station in Ujjain. The station was previously used as a meter-gauge station on Ratlam–Indore line. Fatehabad has a connecting route to Ujjain Junction on a meter-gauge line.

In 2015, Ratlam–Indore was converted into broad-gauge line, directly connecting Indore and Ratlam.

Fatehabad and Chandrawati Ganj are two villages on the Indore–Ujjain district border. Fatehabad village is under the Ujjain district and Chandrawati Ganj village is under the Indore district.

As of November 2021, the gauge-conversion of Fatehabad-Ujjain via Chintaman station has been completed and Ujjain - Indore MEMU Special is operating on the route.

Major trains
These trains pass through the station.

See also

References 

Railway stations in Ujjain district
Ratlam railway division
Railway junction stations in Madhya Pradesh
Year of establishment missing